Raimondas Vilėniškis (born 10 June 1976) is a retired Lithuanian footballer.

External links
 

1976 births
Living people
Lithuanian footballers
Lithuania international footballers
FK Žalgiris players
Wisła Płock players
Lithuanian expatriate sportspeople in Poland
Expatriate footballers in Poland
FK Kareda Kaunas players
Association football midfielders